Metropathia haemorrhagica, also known as metropathia haemorrhagica cystica, is a menstrual disorder which is defined as a specialized type of anovulatory dysfunctional uterine bleeding associated with endometrial hyperplasia and intermenstrual bleeding. The condition was defined by 1930. It has been agreed that the term "metropathia haemorrhagica" should be discarded along with many other older terms for menstrual disorders.

References

Menstrual disorders